Ana Teresa Aranda Orozco (born January 26, 1954 in León, Guanajuato) is a Mexican politician affiliated with the National Action Party who served as Director of the DIF (the "National System for Integral Family Development") from 2000 to 2006. In January 2006 President Vicente Fox designated her Secretary of Social Development.

Political career
Aranda has been an active member of the National Action Party in the state of Puebla, from 1995 to 1998 she served as the president of the PAN in that state.   In 1998 she unsuccessfully ran for the governorship of Puebla and in the 2000 elections she unsuccessfully ran for a seat in the Senate.

References 

1954 births
Living people
Politicians from Guanajuato
People from León, Guanajuato
National Action Party (Mexico) politicians
Mexican Secretaries of Social Development
Aranda Orozco
Women Secretaries of State of Mexico
21st-century Mexican politicians
21st-century Mexican women politicians